Jano is municipality of Honduras.

Jano may also refer to:

Places
Pico Jano, mountain of Spain

People
Jano (footballer, born 1980), Spanish footballer
Jano (footballer, born 1986), Spanish footballer
Avishai Jano (born 1970), Israeli footballer
Vittorio Jano (1891–1965), Italian automobile designer
Jean Leguay alias Jano (born 1955), French artist